Inti Watana or Intiwatana (Quechua) is an archaeological site in Peru. It lies in the Cusco Region, Calca Province, Pisac District.

See also 
 Machu Kuntur Sinqa

References 

Archaeological sites in Peru
Archaeological sites in Cusco Region